The Baldwin DRS-6-4-1000  is a diesel-electric locomotive built by Baldwin Locomotive Works between 1948 and 1949.

Name Designation
DRS - Diesel Road Switcher 
6 - Six axles 
4 - Four powered axles 
1000 - 1,000 horsepower

Original buyers

References
 
 

Diesel-electric locomotives of Algeria
A1A-A1A locomotives
DRS-6-4-1000
Railway locomotives introduced in 1948